"3" is a song by American singer Britney Spears from her second greatest hits album, The Singles Collection (2009). It was written and produced by Max Martin and Shellback, with additional writing from Tiffany Amber. The song was released on September 29, 2009, by Jive Records, as the only single from The Singles Collection. "3" is an uptempo electropop song that features a heavy bassline and synthesizers, and lyrics that talk about threesomes, while referencing American folk-singing trio Peter, Paul and Mary during the chorus as sexual slang.

"3" received positive reception from contemporary music critics, with some reviewers calling it a classic Spears song. The song was a commercial success, topping the charts in the United States and Canada, as well as reaching the top ten in many countries around the world, including Australia, Finland, Norway, Sweden and the United Kingdom. In the United States, the song debuted at number one in the Billboard Hot 100, and became her third number-one single in the country.

An accompanying music video for "3", directed by Diane Martel, features Spears and her dancers in front of different black and white backgrounds. Martel described it as sexy and playful, while contemporary critics gave it positive reviews, complimenting its simplicity. A director's cut was leaked on December 15, 2009. Spears has performed "3" during her Femme Fatale Tour (2011) and her concert residency Britney: Piece of Me (2013–2016).

Background
On July 12, 2009, Spears confirmed through her Twitter account that she had begun recording new material, stating she was going into the studio with Swedish songwriter and producer Max Martin, while she was in Stockholm during the European leg of The Circus Starring Britney Spears. They had previously collaborated on earlier hits including "...Baby One More Time", "Oops!...I Did It Again", "Stronger" and "If U Seek Amy". "3" was written and produced by Martin and Shellback, while additional writing was done by Tiffany Amber. Spears recorded her vocals for the song with the producers at Maratone Studios. John Hanes was responsible for Spears' vocal editing on "3", which was later mixed by Serban Ghenea at MixStar Studios in Virginia Beach, Virginia. On September 23, 2009, Jive Records officially announced the release of a greatest hits titled The Singles Collection through Spears's official website, in celebration of Spears's ten-year anniversary in the music industry, also  announcing the release of "3" as the lead single from the album. The artwork for the single was unveiled through Spears' official website on September 28, 2009. "3" was sent to radio stations on September 29, 2009, while being digitally released on October 2, 2009.

Composition

"3" is an uptempo electropop song which opens with synths and vocal effects. The song has a basic sequence of Fm–E–Bm–Fm as its chord progression. Spears' vocals span from C4 to the high note of C5. During the middle eight, the song slows down with synthetic strings and bass beats, and the section ends with a beat similar to a four-on-the floor, a rhythm pattern  popularized in 1970s disco music. Throughout the song, Spears' vocals are autotuned. The song lasts for three minutes and twenty-five seconds. However, eight seconds of silence are added in the end to total the duration to 3:33; a nod to the title of the song.

The song's lyrics are about threesomes. Unlike "If U Seek Amy", the song has no double entendre and it's more straightforward lyrically. The innuendo in the lyrics such as "Merrier the more, triple fun that way" have been compared to the songs in Prince's 1980 studio album Dirty Mind. The chorus has been compared to a playground chant and closes with an extended moan. During the second part of the chorus, there is a reference to the folk group Peter, Paul & Mary. Todd Martens of the Los Angeles Times called the reference "the cut's biggest oddity".

Critical reception
"3" received positive reviews from contemporary music critics. Monica Herrera of Billboard commented that the song "builds to a climax of wildly pulsing bass that summons fans to the dancefloor" and added that "[it] will be another notch in this pop provocateur's belt". On its online edition, Rolling Stones writer Daniel Kreps praised the song for its up-tempo melody and racy lyrics, while comparing it to Flo Rida's recent work, saying that "3" "is more of a surefire dance-floor stomper than anything Brit loaded onto Blackout or Circus". On the printed issue, the magazine gave the song four stars and called it an "instant Britney classic". Clark Collis of Entertainment Weekly called it "a fembot voice, near-seizure-inducing dance-floor frenzy". While crediting the production for "elevating the song above typical dance products", the Los Angeles Times said that Spears sounded "sweetly generic".

In his review of The Singles Collection, Stephen Thomas Erlewine of AllMusic selected "3" as one of the "track picks" and commented, "[it is] much better than any of the three new cuts on My Prerogative". Bill Lamb of About.com said that although the lyrics are controversial, "the bottom line is this is another irresistibly catchy pop confection that beats out most everything else on pop radio today". He praised the chorus and the middle section and called the track "classic Britney". The song was also compared to Madonna's "Celebration", since they "musically present nothing particularly new, but they do manage to encapsulate many of the elements that make the singer a star". A.J. Mayers of MTV picked it as the eighth best song of 2009.

Chart performance

On October 8, 2009, "3" entered at number fourteen on the US Billboard Bubbling Under Hot 100 and at number thirty-eight on the US Billboard Pop Songs, becoming Spears' twenty-fourth career entry in the latter chart, most among all artists. The following week, the song debuted at number one on the Billboard Hot 100, becoming Spears' third number-one single in the United States and breaking many of the chart records. It made Spears the first artist in over three years to debut at the top position and the only non-American Idol artist in eleven years to do so. It was the fifteenth song in the chart history to debut at the top position and also the shortest title for a song reaching the top of the Billboard Hot 100. The song also charted at number one on the Billboard Digital Songs, selling 255,000 downloads in its first week and having the highest one week total of any song, since The Black Eyed Peas' "Boom Boom Pow" back in April 2009. As of October 2015, "3" has sold 2.4 million digital downloads in the United States according to Nielsen SoundScan. It is her fourth best-selling digital single in the country. In Canada, the song debuted at number eighty-six on the Canadian Hot 100 on October 17, 2009, and rose up to number one the following week, making it the biggest jump to number one in the history of the chart. It was certified double platinum by the Canadian Recording Industry Association (CRIA) for sales over 80,000 copies.

"3" debuted at number fifty on the Australian Singles Chart on October 12, 2009, with only two days of digital sales. It peaked at number six on the week of October 26, 2009. "3" has been certified platinum by the Australian Recording Industry Association (ARIA) with sales of over 70,000 copies. On October 12, 2009, the song debuted at number sixteen in New Zealand, making it her highest chart debut since "Womanizer". On its fifth week on the chart, "3" reached its peak position at number twelve. On the UK Singles Chart, "3" debuted at number seven on November 16, 2009, becoming Spears' twentieth top ten hit on the chart. According to The Official Charts Company, the song has sold 145,000 copies there. "3" achieved similar success throughout Europe reaching the top ten in Belgium (Wallonia), Czech Republic, Finland, Norway, Sweden as well as the top twenty in Austria, Belgium (Flanders) and Denmark.

Music video

The music video was filmed on October 5 and October 6, 2009, in Los Angeles, California. It was directed by Diane Martel and choreographed by Tone & Rich. Fashion stylist GK Reid worked closely with Spears to design the fashion. On October 15, 2009, images of the video were released. A countdown, including images and video previews, was announced on her official website and the release date was revealed to be on October 30, 2009. When asked about the video, Diane Martel said,
"I think it's her next sexy video. It's a very simple video for her – I don't think you've seen her this much under a magnifying glass. Everything's really strong and playful. We collaborated on the wardrobe and had meetings about hair and makeup people, we talked a lot on the phone and met Tone and Rich — two of the best choreographers. [..] [Spears]' so sweet and funny and so normal and down to earth. It's really fun as a director to see her in front of the camera. She's so creative with this stuff. The video is very simple, it's very, very minimal. So it's her, her, her. And she's totally engaging every second. She really knows how to work with a camera and move. I was really impressed, and I have worked almost with every female artist in the business".

The video begins with Spears wearing a sparkly black dress at a dressing table, putting mascara and Circus Fantasy on. Then, it cuts to her holding her hair up and singing the first lines in front of a white background. There are also black and white scenes of her wearing a white leotard behind a foggy glass. She then appears wearing the leotard and glasses, while surrounded by four female dancers wearing black outfits, hanging from a raised barre. The word "sin" is censored and changed for the word "this" during the pre-chorus. In the chorus, she dances in front of a white wall with barcode-like light installations with six male dancers. There also  scenes of her dancing provocatively with two male dancers. At the bridge, there are intercut close-ups of her that end with a smirk. The video concludes with Spears dancing with the two male dancers and cuts to a close-up of her looking into the camera.

Rolling Stone writer Daniel Kreps compared the video with the music video of "Single Ladies (Put a Ring on It)" and complimented the choreography saying Spears had not danced with so much conviction since the In the Zone era. Bradley Stern of MuuMuse likened the video's choreography and dancer's wardrobe to Janet Jackson's "Feedback" video. Jocelyn Vena of MTV gave the video a positive review, stating that it's a "sexy, fast-paced clip" and that "there are a few moments in the video where Britney's personality shines" adding that "she smiles at the song's tongue-in-cheek lyrics, particularly when she finishes the song's bridge." Tanner Stransky of Entertainment Weekly complimented the video's choice of wardrobe, but said that the video was "sparse", adding "there's not much to the single besides trite, ridiculous advocation for a ménage à trois anyway, so why would the video go any deeper?".

On December 15, 2009, a director's cut version of the video for "3" leaked online. Kreps commented that the new version "offers up a slightly more NSFW edit of Martel's dance-heavy vid that seems to find a better cadence with the music, as opposed to the original version, which was essentially filmed and edited in the matter of days to coincide with The Singles Collection release".

Live performances and cover version

On March 25, 2011, Spears performed a special show at Rain Nightclub in Las Vegas. The setlist of the show consisted on three songs from her seventh studio album, Femme Fatale, including "Hold It Against Me", "Big Fat Bass" and "Till the World Ends". During the performance of "Big Fat Bass", Spears wore a latex bodysuit and an excerpt of "3" was included in the middle of the performance. Additionally, elements of "Womanizer, "Gimme More" and "I'm a Slave 4 U" were also included. On March 27, 2011, "Big Fat Bass" was also performed at the Bill Graham Civic Auditorium that aired on Good Morning America on March 29, 2011, and the same day, Spears performed the set at Jimmy Kimmel Live!, both with the same "3" excerpt.

"3" was performed at 2011's Femme Fatale Tour, for the first time in its entirety. After "Up n' Down", Spears put on a white fedora and trench coat and performed the song with her female dancers, dressed in a similar style. Shirley Halperin of The Hollywood Reporter named it one of the best performances of the show along with "Piece of Me" and "Don't Let Me Be the Last to Know", stating that "ironically enough, [they] were the ones with fewest frills." Rick Florino of Artistdirect said "'3' gave way to a massive sing-a-long" and added that it "[spoke] right to the noir-ish connotations of the Femme Fatale tour. However, she built a one-of-a-kind space where Kim Basinger's elegant L.A. Confidential beauty becomes enveloped by edgy modern dance attitude."

Spears performed "3" as the third song on her Las Vegas residency, Britney: Piece of Me, as part of the original setlist. After a brief talk with the audience, the singer began a performance of the song, jumping into a triangular cage which was wheeled around by her dancers across the stage. A parallel bar then dropped out of the ceiling, and Spears performed  choreography similar to the choreography in song's music video. For Billboards Keith Caulfield, the song "served as the sexiest jungle gym in Vegas, as Spears and her dancers undulated their way across and around the bar". Girls' Generation member Sunny performed a cover version of the song during the Girls' Generation Tour that took place in 2011 and 2012. A studio version was also released online alongside the live version featuring on the tour album.

Track listings

Digital download
 "3" – 3:33

Digital download single/CD single
 "3" – 3:33
 "3" (instrumental) – 3:33The Singles Collection box set single "3" – 3:33
 "3" (Groove Police Club Mix) – 7:08International digital EP 1 "3" – 3:33
 "3" (The Knocks Extended Remix) – 5:47
 "3" (DiscoTech Remix Club Edit) – 4:23
 "3" (Tonal Club Remix) – 5:04
 "3" (Trypsin Club Mix) – 7:45International digital EP 2– The Remixes "3" – 3:33
 "3" (instrumental) – 3:33
 "3" (Wolfgang Gartner Extended Club Mix) – 6:35
 "3" (Groove Police Club Mix) – 7:09
 "3" (Manhattan Clique Remix Radio) – 3:36Japan – Enhanced CD EP'''
 "3" – 3:33
 "3" (instrumental) – 3:33
 "3" (Groove Police Mixshow) – 7:08
 "3" (Groove Police Radio Edit) – 3:57
 "3" (enhanced video) – 3:36

Credits and personnel
 Britney Spears – lead and background vocals
 Max Martin – songwriting, production, keyboards
 Shellback – songwriting, production, keyboards, guitars
 Serban Ghenea – mixing
 Tim Roberts – assistant engineer
 John Hanes – vocal editing

Charts

Weekly charts

Year-end charts

Certifications and sales

Release history

References

2009 singles
2009 songs
Billboard Hot 100 number-one singles
Britney Spears songs
Canadian Hot 100 number-one singles
Group sex
Jive Records singles
Music videos directed by Diane Martel
Song recordings produced by Max Martin
Song recordings produced by Shellback (record producer)
Songs written by Max Martin
Songs written by Shellback (record producer)
Songs written by Sophia Somajo